White Lies is the seventh studio album released by the group Deine Lakaien, released in 2002.

Track listing
"Wunderbar" – 4:15 
"Generators" – 4:45 
"Where You Are" – 4:10 
"Prayer" – 4:57 
"Stupid" – 3:46 
"Kiss" – 4:00 
"Silence in Your Eyes" – 4:37 
"Hands White" – 5:52 
"Lost" – 5:59 
"Fleeting" – 4:05 
"Life is a Sexually Transmitted Disease" – 5:03 
"One Minus One" – 4:44

Double LP Bonus Tracks
"May Be" – 4:12
"Generators (Whitemix)" – 3:58
"Life Is (Single Version)" – 4:04
"Generators (Club Version)" – 4:51

Remixes
"Where You Are (VNV Nation Remix)" - 5:04

2002 albums
Deine Lakaien albums